Richard Benyon (born 30 June 1964) is a British gymnast. He competed in eight events at the 1984 Summer Olympics.

References

External links
 

1964 births
Living people
British male artistic gymnasts
Olympic gymnasts of Great Britain
Gymnasts at the 1984 Summer Olympics
Sportspeople from Newport, Wales